Michael Thomas Turner (born 9 November 1983) is an English former professional footballer who played as a defender.

Club career

Charlton Athletic
Born in Lewisham, London, Turner started his career at Charlton Athletic. As part of a link-up Charlton had with Internazionale, he spent several months of his apprenticeship with the Italian club's under-19 team. After signing professional terms with Charlton, he went out on loan to Leyton Orient in March 2003 until the end of the 2002–03 season. The following season, he was captain of Charlton's reserve team, and was named Charlton's Young Player of the Year 2003–04.

Brentford
In August 2004, Turner joined Brentford on an initial one-month loan, which was later extended to two, then three, months. At the end of his loan spell, in November 2004, Brentford signed Turner permanently, on a two-and-a-half-year contract, for an undisclosed fee.
He was highly rated at Griffin Park, being voted Players' Player of the Year in the 2004–05 season and Supporters' Player of the Year in the 2005–06 season.

Hull City
In July 2006, Turner joined Hull City, for a fee of £350,000, on a three-year contract.
Turner was Phil Parkinson's first signing for the Tigers, during his short spell in charge. Parkinson said of the signing: "He's a player that I've watched for a number of years, firstly with Charlton reserves and then obviously with Brentford. I like him a lot and believe he'll be an excellent signing for us because he's ready to play Championship football. Michael was the best central defender in League One last season and is ready to step up."

After a very disappointing start to the 2006–07 season, Turner's form significantly improved, and he finished the season as one of the club's successes of the year. He was voted Hull City's Player of the Season in their promotion-winning 2007–08 season. His good form was rewarded, as he signed a new three-year deal with Hull in April 2008.

Turner scored his first Premier League goal in September 2008 during the 2–2 draw at home to Everton. Turner scored his second goal of the 2008–09 season against West Ham United in October, which proved to be the winning goal of the match with the game ending 1–0 to Hull City at the KC Stadium.

Turner played every minute of every Premier League game for Hull in 2008–09, and was one of only two outfield players to do so, the other being Portsmouth's Sylvain Distin. At the end of the season Turner was named as the Official Supporters Club's player of the year for the third season in a row, as well as the club's official player of the year for the second season in a row.

On 31 August 2009, after Turner had been repeatedly linked with Liverpool and Manchester City amongst other clubs, a bid was finally accepted from Sunderland after Hull City manager Phil Brown claimed that offers currently tabled for Turner were "getting towards a ridiculous valuation".

Sunderland

Sunderland completed the signing of Turner on a four-year contract for an undisclosed fee initially thought to be at least £6 million, but later revealed to be just £4 million, with Charlton receiving part of the transfer fee as a sell-on-clause. Turner made his Sunderland debut against former club Hull City. Turner thought he had scored on his debut against his former club, but the goal, Sunderland's fourth, was later credited as a Kamil Zayatte own goal. Turner scored his first Sunderland goal and completed the full 90 minutes against Wolverhampton Wanderers in the Premier League on 27 September 2009 in a 5–2 victory.
On 19 December 2009 Turner was sent off during Sunderland's 4–3 defeat at Manchester City. Sunderland appealed the decision, but it was rejected, and Turner controversially had his suspension increased to four matches. Turner played his first game of the 2010–11 season against Colchester United in the League Cup 2nd round tie at the Stadium of Light. On 29 August 2010, he started his first premier league match of the season against Manchester City but had to be replaced through injury at half-time by Phil Bardsley in a 1–0 win at the Stadium of Light. He did not make his return to the first team until 25 September against Liverpool at Anfield, when he completed the full 90 minutes alongside Titus Bramble in the 2–2 draw. On 2 October, Turner played the full 90 minutes against Manchester United in a 0–0 draw at the Stadium of Light. On 18 October 2010, he started and played the full 90 minutes against Blackburn Rovers at Ewood Park in a 0–0 draw. In November, Turner sustained a knee injury making a goal-line clearance in Sunderland's 2–2 draw with Everton. The injury ruled Turner out for several months, and although he returned to action in March, his form dropped and he continued to struggle for fitness.

After returning to full fitness, Turner started his first game of the 2011–12 season on 1 October, a 2–2 draw with West Bromwich. He retained his place in the next three games, a defeat at Arsenal, an away win at Bolton and a home draw with Aston Villa, before suffering a re-occurrence of his injury. He returned to action on 14 January away to Chelsea, replacing Matthew Kilgallon who had himself suffered an injury, as Sunderland lost 1–0. He started for the Black Cats in their back to back wins against Norwich and Stoke, helping keep clean sheets in the process. Turner also started in Sunderland's FA Cup fourth round replay at Middlesbrough, and was widely blamed for Lukas Jutkiewicz's equaliser, although Sunderland went on to win in extra time.

Norwich City
On 27 July 2012, Norwich City manager Chris Hughton revealed that the club had signed Sunderland's Michael Turner on a 2-year deal for an undisclosed fee. He scored his first goal for the club on 27 October with a late header to earn Norwich a point in a 1–1 draw away to Aston Villa. In April 2013, he scored in back-to-back games, in a 2–2 draw against Swansea City and a 1–3 loss against Arsenal.

On 12 March 2015, Turner joined Fulham on loan and scored on 25 April against Middlesbrough at Craven Cottage.

In May 2017, it was announced that Turner would be released when his contract expired.

Sheffield Wednesday (loan)
On 27 August 2015, Turner joined Championship side Sheffield Wednesday on a season-long loan. He made his debut on 19 September in a 3–2 home win over former side Fulham in which he scored the 3rd goal. On 14 December, he expressed his want for a permanent move to Wednesday as he was no longer featured in his parent club Norwich City since February.

Southend United
On 11 July 2017, Turner joined League One team Southend United. He made 65 appearances and scored five goals before his release at the end of the 2018–19 season.

International career
A string of good performances in October 2008 led teammate Dean Marney to call for Turner's inclusion in the England squad, claiming that he had outshone England rivals Jonathan Woodgate and Matthew Upson.
However, Hull City manager Phil Brown remarked at the time that such calls were "premature".

Career statistics

References

External links

1983 births
Living people
Footballers from Lewisham
English footballers
Association football defenders
Charlton Athletic F.C. players
Leyton Orient F.C. players
Brentford F.C. players
Hull City A.F.C. players
Sunderland A.F.C. players
Norwich City F.C. players
Fulham F.C. players
Sheffield Wednesday F.C. players
Premier League players
English Football League players